Pulsipher is an English surname. It may refer to: 

 Bill Pulsipher
 Lewis Pulsipher
 Lindsay Pulsipher
 Susan Pulsipher, Utah House of Representatives
 Zera Pulsipher

See also
 Juanita Pulsipher Brooks